Darwan is a large village in Mohania block of Kaimur district, Bihar, India. It is located immediately north of Mohania, with the two being separated by the Grand Chord railway tracks. As of 2011, its population was 7,096, in 1,083 households.

References 

Villages in Kaimur district